Helena Peterson (born April 8, 1962) is a former Swedish Olympic freestyle swimmer. She competed in the 1980 Summer Olympics, where she swam the prelims for the silver medal winning Swedish 4×100 m freestyle relay team.

Clubs
SK Neptun

References

1962 births
Living people
Swimmers at the 1980 Summer Olympics
Olympic swimmers of Sweden
Olympic silver medalists for Sweden
Swedish female freestyle swimmers